Yvonne Musik (born ) is a German female artistic gymnast, representing her nation at international competitions.

She participated at the 2003 World Artistic Gymnastics Championships, and the 2004 Summer Olympics.

References

External links
http://www.gymmedia.com/node/14592

1985 births
Living people
German female artistic gymnasts
Place of birth missing (living people)
Olympic gymnasts of Germany
Gymnasts at the 2004 Summer Olympics
20th-century German women
21st-century German women